Alison Elder is an English former cricketer who played as a batter and occasional wicket-keeper. She appeared in four One Day Internationals for England in 1990, making her debut against The Netherlands. In total she scored 43 runs, with a best of 37 not out, and took six catches. She played domestic cricket for East Anglia and Yorkshire.

References

External links
 
 

Living people
Year of birth missing (living people)
Place of birth missing (living people)
England women One Day International cricketers
Yorkshire women cricketers